Veronica Borsi (born 13 June 1987 in Bracciano) is an Italian hurdler.

Biography
In 2012 with her personal best in the 100 metres hurdles, 13.05 has obtained the pass for her first Olympic appearance in London 2012 and also the standard for 2012 European Athletics Championships in Helsinki.

In 2013, she sets her personal best in the 60 metres hurdles on Mondeville, France, with the crono of 8.06, sixth world best of the year at that day. Than, in 2013, she set also national record in 60 m hs (7.94 at European Indoor Championships) and 100 m hs (12.76).

After a few unlucky seasons, 2018 had started in the best way for Borsi, who had managed to get the qualification for the Indoor World Championships. But the season started on 5 May, at the Italian Athletics Clubs Championships in Ostia, with an injury to the Achilles tendon that forced her to quit the 2018 season.

National records
 60 metres hurdles: 7.94 ( Gothenburg, 1 March 2013) - Current holder
 100 metres hurdles: 12.76 ( Orvieto, 2 June 2013) - Current holder

Progression
100 metres hurdles

Personal bests
100 m hs: 12.76 - 2 June 2013  Orvieto 
60 m hs: 7.94 - 1 March 2013  Gothenburg

Achievements

National titles
 Italian Athletics Indoor Championships
  60 metres hurdles: 2012, 2013, 2018

See also
 Italian records in athletics
 Italian all-time lists - 100 metres hurdles

References

External links
 

1987 births
Living people
People from Bracciano
Italian female hurdlers
Mediterranean Games silver medalists for Italy
Athletes (track and field) at the 2013 Mediterranean Games
World Athletics Championships athletes for Italy
Mediterranean Games medalists in athletics
Sportspeople from the Metropolitan City of Rome Capital
20th-century Italian women
21st-century Italian women